Satan War is a 1979 American horror film written and directed by Bartell LaRue. The film is similar to The Amityville Horror.

Plot
Newlyweds Bill and Louise Foster move into the house of their dreams but it quickly becomes a nightmare. Goop oozes out of cabinets and coffee pots, little earthquakes keep happening, things go bump in the night, kitchen chairs keep running into Louise, and worst of all, the Foster's cross keeps inverting itself over and over on their wall.

Cast
 Sally Schermerhorn as Louise Foster
 Jimmy Drankovitch as Bill Foster

External links 
 

1979 films
1979 horror films
American haunted house films
American supernatural horror films
1970s English-language films
1970s American films